Eugen Pleško (10 November 1948 – 4 February 2020) was a Croatian cyclist. He competed in the individual road race at the 1972 Summer Olympics.

References

External links
 

1948 births
2020 deaths
Yugoslav male cyclists
Croatian male cyclists
Olympic cyclists of Yugoslavia
Cyclists at the 1972 Summer Olympics